The short-snouted elephant shrew or short-snouted sengi (Elephantulus brachyrhynchus) is a species of elephant shrew in the family Macroscelididae. It is found over a wide area of Africa. Its natural habitats are dry savanna and subtropical or tropical dry lowland grassland.

Conservation status and threats 
The short-snouted elephant shrew is listed as of least concern by the IUCN because it inhabits immense areas of southern Africa that are generally not inhabited by humans. While no specific threats to this species are apparent, possible future threats to the short-snouted elephant shrews include bush encroachment and desertification.

Location 
This species is found from northern South Africa through northeast Namibia, east and central Botswana, Angola, Zimbabwe, Malawi, Zambia and Mozambique north to the Democratic Republic of Congo. In East Africa, they are found in Tanzania, Kenya and Uganda.

Habitat 
Short-snouted elephant shrews inhabit arid and semi-arid habitats. They prefer densely covered bush lands and scrub such as dry savannas and grasslands.

Lifespan 
While knowledge on the lifespan of short-snouted elephant shrews are limited, one specimen lived 4.2 years in captivity.

Physical description 
Short-snouted elephant shrews have an average length of 21 cm from head to tail and weigh 1.41 to 2.11oz on average. They have varied brown body fur with white, buffy or off-white rings around the eyes and upper lip. They have brownish-yellow patches behind the ears. While they have the long, narrow snout symbolic of elephant shrews, their snouts are shorter than the snouts of other species and a bit tapered. The small size of the short-snouted elephant shrew makes it potential prey for birds of prey, big cats and snakes.

Reproduction 
Short-snouted elephant shrews form monogamous relationships and mate for life. Females are able to produce five to six litters per year with a gestation period of 57 to 65 days. Each litter consists of one to two individuals that are born fully furred, open-eyed and able to run almost immediately after birth. Young are 10g when born, and it takes them 50 days to reach adult size. After approximately 15 days, offspring establish their own home ranges.

Behavior 
Short-snouted elephant shrews are diurnal with their most active period being early morning. While they are sometimes in pairs, they are mostly solitary animals. They are a fast moving species that scurries from place to place and avoids open areas without cover. Short-snouted elephant shrews exhibit a high degree of territoriality with each sex driving individuals of their own sex out of the pair's territory. They utilize a network of safety burrows by digging their own burrows or stealing pre-existing burrows of rodents.

Diet 
Short-snouted elephant shrews are mainly insectivorous. Their primary diet consists of ants, termites, grasshoppers and crickets. However, they are opportunistic foragers and will feed on vegetation, fruits and seeds if necessary.

Communication 
Short-snouted elephant shrews communicated through chemical and tactile means.
Each short-snouted elephant shrew marks its trails with scent glands located behind its ears. Marking territory serves two purposes for short-snouted elephant shrews: establishing territories and alerting their mate of their location. They often exhibit a behavior called footdrumming, which is rapid tapping of the hind legs. This behavior is exhibited in response to a stressful situation like mating or avoiding a predator.

References 

Elephant shrews
Taxonomy articles created by Polbot
Mammals described in 1836